The Merchant Shipping Act 1854 (17 & 18 Vict c. 104) is an Act of the Parliament of the United Kingdom. It was passed on 10 August 1854, together with the Merchant Shipping Repeal Act 1854 (17 & 18 Vict c. 120), which together repealed several centuries of preceding maritime legislation.

It introduced the keeping of official numbers for registered ships, and revised calculations of tonnage. It also changed the management of lighthouses in Scotland and neighbouring islands, vesting it in the Northern Lighthouse Board which was one of the General Lighthouse Authorities the act created. It also (indirectly) created the Sea Gallantry Medal, the only UK state honour created by Act of Parliament, rather than Royal Warrant.

As with many older Acts, it was repealed in its entirety by the subsequent Merchant Shipping Act 1894 (57 & 58 Vict c. 60).

In January 2007, after looting of the cargo of the container ship, the MSC Napoli, acting Receiver of Wreck Mark Rodaway said he would invoke powers of this Act for the first time in 100 years, although the extant powers to which he referred are actually held under the more recent, replacement, legislation.

See also

List Merchant Shipping Acts

Sources 
Research guide: Ship Registration AC.uk
Lighthouses on the Isle of Man, Isle-of-man.com
Merchant Shipping Act, 1854
Merchant Shipping Repeal Act 1854
Merchant Shipping Act, 1894

References 

United Kingdom Acts of Parliament 1854
1854 in transport
Shipping in the United Kingdom